The city, unitary authority area and ceremonial county of Bristol contains a wide range of museums, defined here as institutions (including nonprofit organisations, government entities, and private businesses) that collect and care for objects of cultural, artistic, scientific, or historical interest and make their collections or related exhibits available for public viewing. Non-profit art galleries and university art galleries are also included, but museums that exist only in cyberspace (i.e., virtual museums) are not.

Many of the museums are in listed buildings. In the United Kingdom, this signifies a building which has been placed on the Statutory List of Buildings of Special Architectural or Historic Interest. In England and Wales, the authority for listing is granted by the Planning (Listed Buildings and Conservation Areas) Act 1990, and is administered by English Heritage. Listed buildings in danger of decay are included on English Heritage's Buildings at Risk Register. There are three types of listed status: Grade I, for buildings "of exceptional interest, sometimes considered to be internationally important"; Grade II*, for "particularly important buildings of more than special interest"; and Grade II, for buildings that are "nationally important and of special interest".

Many of the museums have been accredited by the Museums, Libraries and Archives Council, which sets national standards for museums in the UK. Several are art galleries providing space for the exhibition of art, or are science, transport, railway, medical or religious museums. The majority of the museums are found within walking distance of Bristol Harbour and have links with the history of the port. There are also historic house museums owned or managed by Bristol City Council, the National Trust or English Heritage.

Current museums

Defunct museums

References

External links

 Museums in Bristol
Bristol
Museums
Bristol